Butz-Choquin is a French pipe maker.  It was founded in 1858 by tobacconists Jean-baptiste Choquin and Gustave Butz.

History 
The company was established in Metz; it remained there until 1951, when it was purchased by the Berrod-Regad company.  It was then relocated to Saint-Claude, Jura.  The company began to export pipes in 1960, receiving the Oscar of Export and the Gold Cup of the French Good Taste.  The company was acquired by Denis Blanc in 2006.

Pipes 
Butz-Choquin's first pipe, the Choquin pipe, was a curved pipe with a flat-bottomed hearth, albatross bone, and silver rings.  The company currently produces over 70 different series of pipes. Butz-Choquin pipes have only been readily available in the United States of America since 1999.

External links 
 Butz-Choquin
  — contains a review of pipes including those of Butz-Choquin
  — another review of several brands of pipes including Butz-Choquin

Pipe makers
French companies established in 1858
Jura (department)
Manufacturing companies of France
Companies based in Bourgogne-Franche-Comté